Det var en gang is a 1994 Norwegian animated film directed by Ketil Jakobsen. It is narrated by Henki Kolstad, and contains the voices of several Norwegian actors. The film contains three of the folk tales collected by Asbjørnsen and Moe: The Little Boys who met the Trolls in Hedal Forest, Three Lemons and The Twelve Wild Ducks.

External links
 
 
 Det var en gang at the Norwegian Film Institute

1994 films
1994 animated films
Norwegian animated films
Films about trolls